John De la Bere was a 15th-century Bishop of St David's in Wales.

De la Bere's parentage is not known for sure, but it is most likely that he was of the family of De la Bere from Stretford Manor in Herefordshire and Weobley Castle in Glamorgan. He may have been a younger son of John De la Bere of Weobley who died in 1433.

He entered the Church and became Dean of Wells before being appointed Bishop of St David's in September 1447 and was consecrated on 19 November that year. De la Bere may have been an Oxford scholar, for it is said that he never set foot in St David's, leaving the running of the diocese to Gruffydd, the son of Sir Rhys ap Thomas.

He lived instead in Oxfordshire where he owned the manor of Clifton Hampden. He paid for the restoration of Dorchester Bridge. He loaned his palace at Lamphey to the Earl of Richmond for his honeymoon with the thirteen-year-old Margaret Beaufort in 1455. It was there that, their son, King Henry VII of England, was conceived.

De la Bere resigned on 23 July 1460, possibly due to his political affiliations during the Wars of the Roses, and was succeeded by Robert Tully.

People from Glamorgan
Bishops of St Davids
15th-century Roman Catholic bishops in Wales
English bishops